Amanaki Lelei Mafi (born 11 January 1990) is a Tongan-born, Japanese professional rugby union player who currently plays as a number 8 for the Japanese Sunwolves, Japan national rugby union team and the Bath Rugby Union team for a short period of time.

Debut 
Mafi represented Tonga U20 in the 2009 Junior World Cup, before moving to Hanazono University in Japan in 2010. After a breakout first season in the Top League for NTT Communications Shining Arcs, Mafi was named in both the Tonga and Japan squad for the 2014 November tests. He opted to play for Japan though, and made an immediate impact which was noted as 'pretty special' by coach Eddie Jones.

Mafi was then sidelined for eight months with a career-threatening dislocated hip injury but recovered just in time to make it back into the 2015 Rugby World Cup squad, where he again impressed. Following the 2015–16 Top League season, he moved to England to join for Bath on a short-term loan deal where he was described as a 'sensation', However his stay was ended early in controversial circumstances following an altercation with the club's medical officer.

Mafi made four appearances for Japan, including scoring two tries, at the 2015 Rugby World Cup and played an important role in the team's historical  34–32 win over the Springboks by providing the winning pass that secured the biggest upset of the tournament.

Career 
Before Mafi's 2014 call up for the Brave Blossoms for his senior international debut against Romania he played in Japan's Kansai Collegiate Rugby Championships.

In 2016, Mafi joined Bath Rugby Team on a short-term contract and made immediate impact with four tries in his first four matches.

In August 2016 Mafi signed to join the Melbourne Rebels to train for the 2017 Super Rugby season. He is currently playing for the Rebels until the end of the season to then return and play in the Japan team.

On November 19, 2016 Mafi won the Man of the Match award in Japan's 33–30 loss to Wales at the Principality Stadium in the Under Armour Autumn Series.

On May 30, 2017 Mafi was named to be in the Brave Blossoms Rugby Union team that represents Japan in international rugby union competitions.

Super Rugby Statistics

References

1990 births
Living people
Japanese rugby union players
Japan international rugby union players
Urayasu D-Rocks players
Bath Rugby players
Rugby union number eights
Expatriate rugby union players in England
Tongan expatriates in Japan
People from Haʻapai
Japanese expatriate rugby union players
Expatriate rugby union players in Australia
Melbourne Rebels players
Sunwolves players
Yokohama Canon Eagles players